The Minam River is a tributary of the Wallowa River,  long, in northeastern Oregon in the United States. It drains a rugged wilderness area of the Wallowa Mountains northeast of La Grande.

It flows generally northwest through the mountains along the Wallowa–Union county line. It joins the Wallowa from the south at the community of Minam near Oregon Route 82. Its headwaters include springs stemming from outflow from Minam Lake, also the source of the Lostine River.

Accessible mainly by United States Forest Service trails, the river basin supports diverse wildlife, including wolverine, bighorn sheep, elk, American black bear, and cougar.

The Minam, except for the lower , where the surrounds have been heavily logged and otherwise altered, is largely pristine. It and the Wenaha River are the two largest rivers in Oregon that are nearly pristine.

Tributaries
From source to mouth, the named tributaries of the Minam River are Pop and Trail creeks, which enter from the left; Lowry Gulch, left; Wild Sheep Creek, right; Granite Gulch, right; Elk Creek, left; and Last Chance Gulch, right. Then Cap, Rock, and Lackey creeks, all from the left; Pole Creek, right, Pot Creek, left; North Minam River, right, and Little Pot and Jerry creeks, left.

Then Threemile, Garwood, Whoopee, Chaparral, Wallowa, Horseheaven, and Horse Basin creeks, all from the right; the Little Minam River, left; Faun Creek, right, and Lobo and Eagle creeks, left. Then Murphy, Trout, Cougar, Gunderson, and Squaw creeks, all from the right.

See also
List of longest streams of Oregon
List of rivers of Oregon
List of National Wild and Scenic Rivers

References

External links
Grande Ronde Model Watershed

Rivers of Oregon
Wild and Scenic Rivers of the United States
Rivers of Wallowa County, Oregon
Rivers of Union County, Oregon
Eagle Cap Wilderness